Maharaja Surachandra Singh was a Meitei King and a Maharaja of Kangleipak, who ruled between 1886 and 1890.  He became the Raja of Manipur in May, 1886 after his father Raja Chandrakirti Singh died.

During his lifetime, Maharaja Chandrakirti intimated the Government of India that his eldest son Surchandra should be recognised by the British as his successor.

The British political agent wanted that the guarantee regarding succession should be extended to the son of Surchandra also. But the Maharaja desired that after Surchandra, as was the tradition followed in Manipur, the brothers of Surchandra should be the king. The Government of India recognised Maharaja Surchandra as the Maharaja of Manipur.

The public avowal made by the Government of India during his father's lifetime was made applicable in his case also. Under this commitment, the British Government was bound to punish anybody who tried to dethrone Maharaja Surchandra.

During the reign of Surchandra, there were three revolts; one by Borachaoba, the eldest son of Maharaja Nara Singh and two others by Wangkheirakpa and Jogendro Singh.

See also
List of Manipuri kings
Manipur (princely state)

References

Bibliography
Hodson, Thomas Callan.The Meitheis. Harvard University, 1908.

Meitei royalty
Hindu monarchs